Pimiento is a type of chili pepper.

Pimiento or Pimento may also refer to:

 Pimento, Indiana, United States, an unincorporated town
 "Pimento" (Better Call Saul), an episode of Better Call Saul
 Adrian Pimento, a character in Brooklyn Nine-Nine
 Jamaican term for allspice
 Pimenta (genus), a genus of flowering plants sometimes called wild pimento
 Carlos Pimiento (born 1968), Colombian retired footballer
 Mauricio Pimiento (born 1961), Colombian politician

See also
 Pimenta (disambiguation)
 Pimentón, Spanish for paprika
 "Pimemento" (Brooklyn Nine-Nine episode)